The Alderson-Coston House is a historic house located at 204 Pine Bluff Street in Malvern, Arkansas.

Description and history 
It is a -story wood-framed structure, rectangular in plan with a cross-gable roof, a projecting porch to the south, a porte-cochere to the east, and a two-story ell to the rear. The exterior is finished in wood veneer siding, and has Craftsman styling, with deep eaves showing rafter ends, and brick piers supporting the porch and porte-cochere. The house was built in 1923, and is a relatively unaltered example of American Craftsman architecture.

The house was listed on the National Register of Historic Places on May 26, 1995.

See also
National Register of Historic Places listings in Hot Spring County, Arkansas

References

Houses on the National Register of Historic Places in Arkansas
Houses completed in 1923
Houses in Hot Spring County, Arkansas
National Register of Historic Places in Hot Spring County, Arkansas
Individually listed contributing properties to historic districts on the National Register in Arkansas
Buildings and structures in Malvern, Arkansas
American Craftsman architecture in Arkansas
1923 establishments in Arkansas
Bungalow architecture in Arkansas